John Mowbray of Barnbougle was a Scottish landowner and supporter of Mary, Queen of Scots.

Family background
John Mowbray's father was born Robert Barton, a son of Robert Barton of Over Barnton, Comptroller of Scotland. He married an heiress, Barbara Mowbray, daughter of John Mowbray of Barnbougle, and took the surname Mowbray. He died in 1538. John Mowbray was a son of his second wife, Elizabeth Crawford.

Career
John Mowbray's lands included Barnbougle Castle close to Cramond Island near Edinburgh. The surname is also written as "Moubray". A French source calls him the Baron de Barnestrudgal.

Mowbray claimed a right to capture Portuguese ships according to old "Letters of Marque" granted to the Barton family and Andrew Barton. The rights were suppressed by the Parliament of Scotland in 1563.

He was one of the jurors who acquitted the Earl of Bothwell of the murder of Lord Darnley.

After the "lang siege" of Edinburgh Castle, at the end of the Marian Civil War in August 1573, Mowbray presented a paper to Regent Morton with offers to save the life of his brother-in-law, William Kirkcaldy of Grange, including £20,000 worth of the jewels of Mary, Queen of Scots, remaining in her supporter's hands.

Mowbray travelled to London and Paris and corresponded with Francis Walsingham. Two of his daughters worked for Mary, Queen of Scots in England.

According to Adam Blackwood's Le Mort de Royne d'Escosse, Mowbray went to London after the execution of Mary, Queen of Scots, to secure the release of her servants, including his daughters.

Marriages and children
His wife, Elizabeth or Elspeth Kirkcaldy, was a sister of William Kirkcaldy of Grange (died 1573). Their children included:
 Robert Mowbray. During the Marian Civil War, in 1572, Robert attempted to capture Dundas Castle. John Mowbray was imprisoned and Barnbougle was garrisoned by the King's party. Robert Mowbray sold Barnbougle to Thomas Hamilton, 1st Earl of Haddington in around 1614.
 Francis Mowbray (died 1593), an intriguer who offered to serve Mary, Queen of Scots, in 1580, and carried letters. 
 Agnes Mowbray, who married Robert Crichton of Eliock
 Elizabeth Mowbray, who married Archibald Napier of Merchiston and Edinbellie. They built Lauriston Castle.
 Marion Mowbray
 Barbara Mowbray (1556-1616), who married Gilbert Curle, a secretary of Mary, Queen of Scots. She died in Antwerp.
 Gillis Mowbray, who served Mary, Queen of Scots, and is said to have been the owner of the Penicuik Jewels.

External links
 Will of Agnes Mowbray (d. 1575), a sister of Barbara Mowbray, National Records of Scotland

References

16th-century Scottish people
Court of Mary, Queen of Scots